Ned Washington (born Edward Michael Washington, August 15, 1901 – December 20, 1976) was an American lyricist born in Scranton, Pennsylvania.

Life and career
Washington was nominated for eleven Academy Awards from 1940 to 1962. He won the Best Original Song award twice: in 1940 for "When You Wish Upon a Star" in Pinocchio and in 1952 for "High Noon (Do Not Forsake Me, Oh My Darlin')" in High Noon.

Washington had his roots in vaudeville as a master of ceremonies. Having started his songwriting career with Earl Carroll's Vanities on Broadway in the late 1920s, he joined the ASCAP in 1930. In 1934, he was signed by MGM and relocated to Hollywood, eventually writing full scores for feature films. During the 1940s, he worked for a number of studios, including Paramount, Warner Brothers, Disney, and Republic.

During these tenures, he collaborated with many of the great composers of the era, including Hoagy Carmichael, Victor Young, Max Steiner, and Dimitri Tiomkin.

With Leigh Harline, he contributed most of the melodic songs that distinguished the Pinocchio soundtrack, including "When You Wish Upon a Star".

He also served as a director of the ASCAP from 1957 until 1976, the year he died of a heart ailment.

Washington is a member of the Songwriters Hall of Fame. His grave is located in Culver City's Holy Cross Cemetery. He was posthumously honored as a Disney Legend, in 2001.

Songs
Some of Washington's songwriting credits include:
 "Town Without Pity" (music by Dimitri Tiomkin, 1961), sung in the movie by Gene Pitney
 "Rawhide" (music by Dimitri Tiomkin, 1958), sung in the TV show by Frankie Laine
 "The 3:10 to Yuma" (music by George Duning, 1957), sung in the movie by Frankie Laine
 "Wild Is the Wind" (music by Dimitri Tiomkin, 1956) sung in the movie by Johnny Mathis
 "Gunfight at the O.K. Corral" (music by Dimitri Tiomkin, 1956), sung in the movie by Frankie Laine
 "The High and the Mighty" (music by Dimitri Tiomkin, 1954) (Deleted from the final "cut" of the movie, but nominated anyway for the Best Song at the 27th Academy Awards; also deleted from the recent "restoration" by Batjac)
 Lyrics from the musical numbers in the film Let's Do It Again, 1953.
 "Return to Paradise" from the film Return to Paradise, (music by Dimitri Tiomkin, 1953
 "High Noon (Do Not Forsake Me, Oh My Darlin')" in the film High Noon, sung by Tex Ritter. 1952
 "My Foolish Heart" (music by Victor Young, 1950)
 "Mad About You", from the film Gun Crazy (music by Victor Young, 1950)
 "On Green Dolphin Street" (music by Bronislau Kaper, 1947)
 "Stella by Starlight" (music by Victor Young), 1944), recorded by Ella Fitzgerald on her Verve album Clap Hands, Here Comes Charlie!, also covered by Thelonious Monk, Miles Davis, and Chet Baker 
 "Baby Mine", "Pink Elephants on Parade", and "When I See an Elephant Fly" for Dumbo (music by Frank Churchill and Oliver Wallace, 1941), the first sung in the movie by Betty Noyes (uncredited); nominated for an Academy Award for Best Song at the 14th Academy Awards and the second by the character Dandy (Jim) Crow, voiced by Cliff Edwards (uncredited), also known as "Ukulele Ike".
 "When You Wish Upon a Star" for Pinocchio (music by Leigh Harline, 1940), sung in the movie by the character Jiminy Cricket, voiced by Cliff Edwards, also known as "Ukulele Ike", won the Academy Award for Best Song at the 13th Academy Awards. 
 "The Nearness of You" (with Hoagy Carmichael, 1938) written for Gladys Swarthout for the film Romance in the Dark 
 "Cosi Cosa" (with Bronislaw Kaper & Walter Jurmann, 1935) sung by Allan Jones in the film A Night at the Opera.
 "Smoke Rings"  (music by H. Eugene Gifford, 1932)
 "I'm Getting Sentimental Over You" (music by George Bassman, 1932), used by Tommy Dorsey as his theme song 
 "I Don't Stand a Ghost of a Chance with You" (music by Victor Young, 1932), recorded by Ella Fitzgerald on her Pablo release Digital III at Montreux.
 "Singin' in the Bathtub" (with Herb Magidson; music by Michael H. Cleary, 1929)

References

External links
 
 [http://www.sensesofcinema.com/2003/28/ballad_of_high_noon/ ''Do Not Forsake 
 Ned Washington at the Songwriters Hall of Fame

1901 births
1976 deaths
20th-century American composers
American musical theatre lyricists
Animation composers
Best Original Music Score Academy Award winners
Best Original Song Academy Award-winning songwriters
Broadway composers and lyricists
Burials at Holy Cross Cemetery, Culver City
Golden Globe Award-winning musicians
Musicians from Scranton, Pennsylvania
Songwriters from Pennsylvania
Walt Disney Animation Studios people